Finnmarken is a local newspaper published in Vadsø, Norway. It covers eastern Finnmark. It was established in 1899 by Adam Egede-Nissen and others.

In 1942 Finnmarken was taken over by the national socialist occupant regime. They incorporated it into Finnmark Folkeblad in 1944. In 1945, after the occupation, this was reversed; however, both Folkets Frihet and Vadsø Arbeiderblad were absorbed into Finnmarken.

It has a circulation of 7,147, of whom 6,302 are subscribers.

Finnmarken (newspaper) is owned by A-pressen Lokale Medier AS, which in turn is owned 100% by A-pressen.

The editor is Karoline Almås Sørensen.

References
Norwegian Media Registry

External links
Website

Newspapers established in 1899
Newspapers published in Norway
Mass media in Finnmark
Vadsø
Liberal Party (Norway) newspapers
Labour Party (Norway) newspapers
1899 establishments in Norway
Amedia